Charles-Alphonse Fournier (November 1, 1871 – October 13, 1941) was a pharmacist and political figure in Quebec. He represented Bellechasse in the House of Commons of Canada from 1917 to 1926 as a Liberal.

He was born in St-Charles de Bellechasse, Quebec, the son of Joseph Fournier and Delina Turgeon, and was educated at the Seminaire de Quebec. Fournier moved to the United States in 1892, becoming a druggist in Fitchburg, Massachusetts. In 1897, he married Ella Mae Eagles. In 1908, he moved to St-Charles de Bellechasse, where he was employed as a druggist. He did not run for reelection to the House of Commons in 1926. Fournier died in Quebec City at the age of 69.

References

Members of the House of Commons of Canada from Quebec
Liberal Party of Canada MPs
Laurier Liberals
1871 births
1941 deaths